Elias Bellows Holmes (May 22, 1807 – July 31, 1866) was a U.S. Representative from New York.

Born in Fletcher, Vermont, Holmes attended the district schools and the academy in St. Albans, Vermont.
He taught school.
He studied law at Pittsford, New York.
He was admitted to the bar in 1830.
He moved to Brockport, New York, in 1831 and commenced the practice of law.
He engaged in agricultural pursuits and transportation.
He engaged in running canal packets between Rochester and Buffalo in 1840–1855.
He was one of the promoters and constructors of the Rochester and Niagara Falls Railroad and a director until it merged with the New York Central Railroad.

Holmes was elected as a Whig to the Twenty-ninth and Thirtieth Congresses (March 4, 1845 – March 3, 1849).
He was not a candidate for renomination.
He resumed agricultural pursuits.
He died in Brockport, New York, July 31, 1866.
He was interred in City Cemetery.

Sources

1807 births
1866 deaths
New York (state) lawyers
People from Pittsford, New York
People from Franklin County, Vermont
Whig Party members of the United States House of Representatives from New York (state)
People from Brockport, New York
19th-century American politicians
St. Albans School (Washington, D.C.) alumni
19th-century American lawyers